Atitlán may refer to:
 Lago de Atitlán, a lake in Guatemala
 Santiago Atitlán, a municipality in the Sololá department of Guatemala
 Santiago Atitlán, Oaxaca, a town and municipality in south-western Mexico
 Volcán Atitlán, a volcano in Guatemala